The Constitution of Andorra provides for freedom of religion, and the Government generally respects this right in practice. There is no state religion; however, the Constitution acknowledges a special relationship with the Roman Catholic Church, which receives some privileges, although no direct subsidies, not available to other religious groups. There are no reports of societal abuses and discrimination based on religious belief or practice.

Religious demography

Few official statistics are available on religion; traditionally, approximately 90% of the population has been Catholic. The population consists largely of immigrants from Spain, Portugal, and France, with full citizens representing less than 36% of the total. The immigrants are also generally Catholic. It is estimated that, of the Catholic population, half are active church attendees. Other Christian groups include the New Apostolic Church; the Church of Jesus Christ of Latter-day Saints (Mormons); several Protestant denominations, including the Anglican Church; the Reunification Church; and Jehovah's Witnesses. Other religious groups include Jews, Muslims (primarily North African immigrants divided into two groups, one more fundamentalist) and Hindus. It is estimated that about 100 Jews live in the country.

Foreign missionaries are active and operate without restriction.

Status of religious freedom

Legal and policy framework
The Constitution acknowledges a special relationship with the Catholic Church "in accordance with Andorran tradition" and recognizes the "full legal capacity" of the bodies of the Catholic Church, granting them legal status "in accordance with their own rules." One of the two constitutionally designated princes of the country (who serves equally as joint head of state with the president of France) is Bishop Joan Enric Vives Sicília of the Spanish town of La Seu d'Urgell.

The Catholic religious celebration on September 8 of the Verge de Meritxell (Virgin of Meritxell) is a national holiday.

There is no law that clearly requires legal registration and approval of religious groups and religious worship. The law of associations is very general and does not mention specifically religious organizations. A consolidated register of associations records all types of associations, including religious groups. Registration is not compulsory; however, groups must register or re-register in order to be considered for the support that the Government provides to nongovernmental organizations. For example, the Government provides support to Caritas, Andorran Migrant Women's Association (ADMA), and the Andorran Women's Associations (ADA). To register or re-register, groups must provide the association statutes, the foundation agreement, a statement certifying the names of persons appointed to official or board positions in the organization, and a patrimony declaration that identifies the inheritance or endowment of the organization. There have been no reports of rejected applications.

The authorities have reportedly expressed concern that some methods used by religious organizations (brainwashing or physical abuse, for example) might prove injurious to public health, safety, morals, or order. These authorities have questioned how they might proceed in such cases but did not mention a specific case. The law does not limit any such groups, although it does contain a provision that no one may be "forced to join or remain in an association against his/her will."

In spite of negotiations for some years between the Muslim community and the Government, no mosque has been built. Nevertheless, the country's 1,300 Muslims have "prayer spaces" and there appear to be no restrictions on the number of these places of worship scattered throughout the country.

Instruction in the tenets of the Catholic faith is available in public schools on an optional basis, outside of both regular school hours and the time frame set aside for elective school activities, such as civics or ethics. The Catholic Church provides teachers for religion classes, and the Government pays their salaries. The Islamic Cultural Center has provided approximately 50 students with Arabic lessons. The Government and the Moroccan community have not yet agreed upon a system that would allow children to receive Arabic classes in school outside of the regular school day. The Government has been willing to offer Arabic classes, but the Muslim community has not been able to find an imam to teach. The Ombudsman has received no complaints from the Muslim community on this issue.

On occasion the Government has made public facilities available to various religious organizations for religious activities.

Government policy and practice have contributed to the generally free practice of religion. There have been no reports of religious prisoners or detainees in the country. There have been no reports of forced religious conversion.

Societal abuses and discrimination
There have been few reports of societal abuses or discrimination based on religious belief or practice. Societal attitudes among religious groups have appeared to be amicable and tolerant. For example, the Catholic Church of la Massana lends its sanctuary twice per month to the Anglican community, so that visiting Anglican clergy can conduct services for the English-speaking community. Although those who practice religions other than Catholicism tend to be immigrants and otherwise not integrated fully into the local community, there appear to be few or no obstacles to their practicing their own religions.

See also
Religion in Andorra
Human rights in Andorra

References
 United States Bureau of Democracy, Human Rights, and Labor. Andorra: International Religious Freedom Report 2007. This article incorporates text from this source, which is in the public domain.
 United States Bureau of Democracy, Human Rights, and Labor. Andorra: International Religious Freedom Report 2015. This article incorporates text from this source, which is in the public domain.

Andorra
Human rights in Andorra
Religion in Andorra